The  National Bank Cricket Arena is a cricket ground in Karachi, Pakistan. The first Test match played at the National Stadium was in 1955 between Pakistan and India. The most recent Test match hosted by the ground, was played in December 2022. The ground has also hosted 48 One Day Internationals (ODIs), the first of these was in 1980 between Pakistan and the West Indies.

In cricket, a five-wicket haul (also known as a "five-for" or "fifer") refers to a bowler taking five or more wickets in a single innings. This is regarded as a notable achievement.

54 five-wicket hauls in Tests have been taken at the ground. Indian Gulabrai Ramchand took the first fifer on the ground in 1955. Imran Khan's 8/60 in 1982 against India are the best bowling figures in an innings.

7 five-wicket hauls in ODIs have been taken at the ground. Waqar Younis took the five-for on the ground in 1990. Ajantha Mendis's 6/13 in 2008 against India in 2008 Asia Cup are the best bowling figures in an innings.

The stadium also maintains an honour board.

Key

Test Match five-wicket hauls

One Day International five-wicket hauls

Notes

References

External links
 Five-wicket hauls at National Stadium, Karachi, CricInfo

National Stadium
National Stadium